Tropical Nights (German: Tropennächte) is a 1931 American German language drama film directed by Leo Mittler and starring Dita Parlo, Robert Thoeren and Fritz Greiner. The film was one of five multi-language versions of the American film Dangerous Paradise (1930) made by Paramount at the Joinville Studios in Paris. These were made in the years following the introduction of sound film, before the practice of dubbing became widespread. The film, like the original American production, is based on Joseph Conrad's 1915 novel Victory.

Cast
 Dita Parlo as Alma 
 Robert Thoeren as Heyst 
 Fritz Greiner as Schomberg 
 Else Heller as Frau Schomberg 
 Fritz Rasp as Jones 
 Manfred Fürst as Ricardo 
 Werner Hollmann as Zangiacomo

References

Bibliography
 Moore, Gene M. Conrad on Film. Cambridge University Press, 2006.

External links
 
 

1931 films
American drama films
1931 drama films
1930s German-language films
Films directed by Leo Mittler
Films based on Polish novels
Films based on works by Joseph Conrad
Paramount Pictures films
Films shot in France
Films shot at Joinville Studios
American multilingual films
American black-and-white films
1931 multilingual films
1930s American films